Reinach may refer to:

Places 
Reinach, Aargau (Reinach AG), a municipality in Switzerland
Reinach, Basel-Landschaft (Reinach BL), a municipality in Switzerland

People 
 Adolf Reinach (1883–1917), German philosopher
 Adolphe Reinach (1887–1914), French archaeologist
 Cobus Reinach (born 1990), South African professional rugby union player
 Elna Reinach (born 1968), South African tennis player
 Baron Jacob Adolphe Reinach, known as Jacques de Reinach (1840–1892), banker implicated in the Panama scandal
 Joseph Reinach (1856–1921), French author and politician
 Salomon Reinach (1858–1932), French archaeologist and religious historian
 Théodore Reinach (1860–1928), French archaeologist, mathematician, jurist, historian and politician